North Providence High School (often abbreviated NPH or NPHS) is a public high school in North Providence, Rhode Island, United States that serves grades 9-12.  It is part of the North Providence School District and its sports teams compete in the Rhode Island Interscholastic League.  North Providence, whose school colors are blue and gold, is home to the Cougars.  The high school graduated its first class in 1940.  In 1992, part of the school burned down while school was still in session.  Trailers were placed in the parking lot and used as classrooms while a new wing was built.  The school grounds include a football and baseball field. Within the building there are three gymnasiums, a fitness and training room, and a wood shop.  The school was formerly equipped with tunnel access to the town’s Natatorium Complex at the Salvatore Mancini .  North Providence High employs 116 faculty and staff for the student body of approximately 1,300 students. North Providence High School holds the distinction of having the highest graduation rate in the state of Rhode Island with 98% of seniors graduating in 2016.

Athletics
Although most of North Providence’s sports teams complete in either Division II or III, many athletes compete at the state level.  
The sports offered at North Providence High School include: 

Football (D IV)
Boys’ and Girls’ Soccer
Boys’ and Girls’ Cross Country
Boys’ and Girls’ Tennis
Dance Team
Cheerleading
Boys’ and Girls’ Basketball
Boys’ and Girls’ Swimming
Ice Hockey
Wrestling (D I)
Boys' and Girls’ Lacrosse
Golf
Boys’ and Girls’ Outdoor Track
Baseball
Fast Pitch Softball (D I)
Boys' and Girls' Volleyball 
Unified Basketball

Extracurricular 

Technology Student Association (TSA)
National Honor Society
Academic Decathlon
Drama Club
International Club
Italian Club
Math Club
Future Business Leaders of America (FBLA)
Student Government Day
Yearbook
Student Council
Mock Trial
Model Legislature
Broadcasters’ Club
Newspaper (Cougar Courier)
Science Olympiad
Concert Band
A Capella
Marching Band
Youth Commission
SADD-Students Against Drunk Driving
Jazz Band
Concert Choir
Gay Straight Alliance
Angel Network 
Nerd Herd
Cougar pause project
E-Sports Team

Student Council
Student Council is made up of six students filling six positions, President, Vice President, Secretary, Treasurer, and Social Committee Girl and Boy.  All grade levels have a Student Council committee that works cooperatively with a Class Advisor to plan class events.  These events include the ordering of class rings, Junior Prom, and during Senior Year, Spirit Week, Spirit Night, Homecoming, Winter Ball, Senior Prom, Senior Class Trip, and Senior Night.

Notable alumni
 Ernie DiGregorio, former NBA player
 Eric Ebron, NFL player
 Cody Wild, professional hockey player

References 

 http://www.northprovidencehighschool.net
 http://www.riil.org
 http://www.rihssports.com
 http://www.rijumpstart.org/matriarch/MultiPiecePage.asp_Q_PageID_E_174_A_PageName_E_studentslifesmartschamps

External links 
 

High schools in Providence, Rhode Island
Public high schools in Rhode Island
1940s establishments in Rhode Island